Gerard "Ged" F. R. Parkin (born February 15, 1959) is a professor of chemistry at Columbia University.

Biography
Gerard Parkin attended the English Martyrs School and Sixth Form College before working under Malcolm Green during both his undergraduate and graduate studies at Queens College of Oxford University.  His work involved exploring the chemistry of tungsten phosphine derivatives.  He obtained a post-doctoral position at the California Institute of Technology working with Professor John Bercaw on tungstenocene reactivity.  In 1988, Ged joined the faculty at Columbia University, where he currently investigates a myriad of problems in main group and transition metal chemistry, including:

 Calixarene complexes
 Retrodative bonding, especially related to boratranes
 Group 6 reactivity relating to X-H (X=H, C, O) bond activation, hydrodesulfurization and hydrodenitrogenation
 The Tris(mercaptoimidazolyl) borate Tm ligand
 Terminal chalcogen metal bonding
 Zinc complexes as models for biological systems
 Antimony alkoxides and aryloxides
 Cleaving the mercury–carbon bond.

Honors
Parkin received the 2008 ACS Award in Organometallic Chemistry and the 1994 ACS Award in pure chemistry from the American Chemical Society.
He also received the Corday–Morgan Medal from the Royal Society of Chemistry in 1995. In 2009 he received the Presidential Award for Excellence in Science, Mathematics and Engineering Mentoring, an award that was presented at a White House ceremony.

References

External links
 Parkin homepage
 The Parkin Website

1959 births
Living people
People educated at English Martyrs School and Sixth Form College
Alumni of The Queen's College, Oxford
California Institute of Technology people
21st-century American chemists
Columbia University faculty